The Soviet RGD-33 (Ручная Граната  Дьяконова образца 33 года >Ruchnaya Granata Djakonova obraztsa 33 goda, "Hand Grenade, Dyakonov design, pattern year [19]33") is an anti-personnel fragmentation stick grenade developed in 1933.

The grenade was composed of three separate pieces that were stored in different crates until use: the warhead and sleeve, spring-loaded handle, and fuze tube. They were assembled and issued only before combat. The warhead and handle were screwed together and carried in a grenade pouch and the fuzes were wrapped in waxed paper and carried separately in the pouch's internal pocket. There was a hole in the outer handle to the right of the thumb catch that lined up with bars of paint on the inner handle, making a colored dot - a white dot meant safe and a red dot meant the handle assembly was cocked. It would not be armed unless the fuze tube had been inserted, which would be done only before throwing.

Use 

Before arming, a locking catch on the outer handle must be released by flipping it to the left, exposing the white dot in the cutout. (This unlocks the inner and outer handles; the inner handle remains fixed and the outer handle rotates.) The operator then grasps the warhead with their offhand and grips the handle with their throwing hand. The handle is then pulled back, rotated clockwise to the right and pushed in; a red dot will appear in the window to indicate it was now cocked. The thumb safety is now pushed to the right to cover the red dot in the cutout, making it safe. The top of the warhead had a metal cover over the fuze well that was pushed aside, allowing the fuse to be inserted; it is disarmed by pushing the catch open, causing the fuze to pop out and be retrieved.

The operator arms the fuze by flipping the switch to the left, exposing the red dot. The operator then throws the grenade; a good throw could send the grenade 30 to 40 metres. The forward momentum of the head and the spring-loaded handle cause the fuze clip to drop back and then move forward, striking the fuze and beginning the time delay.

Upon detonation the shell fragments in rectangular, thin fragments, which, along with the casing and detonator fragments, decelerate rapidly in air. Due to the fragments' rapid loss of velocity, the kill radius is small, making this grenade an "offensive" type. The fragmentation kill radius was approximately 15 metres with the sleeve and 10 metres without. As with most grenades of this era, there is potential for large fragment projection a great distance further than the throw.

The grenade was unusual but not unique, in that it had an optional "jacket" – a thick metal fragmentation sleeve weighing an average of 270 grams. When fitted over the grenade the sleeve improves the kill radius by producing a number of diamond-shaped, heavier fragments. With the jacket installed the grenade was said to be in "defensive" mode.

History 
It was designed to replace the ageing Model 1914 grenade and was used during World War II. The grenade was complicated to use and manufacture. After the German invasion of the USSR, the simple and crude RG-42 was developed to slowly replace it.

Axis forces used captured stores as the HG 337(r), or Handgranate 337 (russische).

See also 
 Model 24 grenade
 List of Russian weaponry

External links 
 Finnish Junkyard 
 Soviet Hand Grenades (Intelligence Bulletin, 1946)

Hand grenades of the Soviet Union
World War II infantry weapons of the Soviet Union
Fragmentation grenades
Military equipment introduced in the 1930s